For the middle eastern dish, see Jalamah (food)

Jalamah or Jalameh is a Palestinian village in the West Bank, located 5 km north of the city of Jenin in the northern West Bank. According to the Palestinian Central Bureau of Statistics, the town had a population of 2,304 inhabitants in mid-year 2006.

History
It has been suggested that this was Jiliimna in the list of places conquered by  Thutmose III.

Ceramics from the Byzantine era have been found here.

Ottoman era
It had a population of 16 households, all Muslim. They paid a  fixed tax rate of 25 % on agricultural products, including wheat, barley, summer crops,  goats and beehives, in addition to  occasional revenues; a total of  8,000 akçe. 

In 1838, it was noted as a village in the Jenin district. 

In 1870, Victor Guérin noted the village on a hill, which sides had cisterns carved into rock and silos. He estimated the village to  have 200 inhabitants, and also noted a  kubbeh for a local saint.

In 1882, the PEF's Survey of Western Palestine (SWP) described Jelameh as: "Resembles  Jabbul. It stands in the plain, surrounded with arable land, and is supplied by cisterns. It has a kubbeh on the north side."

British Mandate  era
In the 1922 census of Palestine, conducted  by the British Mandate authorities, Jalameh had a population of 261; 253 Muslims and 8 Christians,  where the Christians were all Orthodox. The population increased in the 1931 census to 304; 300 Muslims and 4 Christians,  in a total of 68  houses.

In the 1944/5 statistics  the population of Jalama was 460, all Muslims, with 5,827 dunams of land, according to an official land and population survey.  Of this, 86 dunams were used  for plantations and irrigable land, 4,777 for cereals, while 15 dunams were built-up (urban) land.

Jordanian era
In the wake of the 1948 Arab–Israeli War, and after the 1949 Armistice Agreements, Jalamah came under Jordanian rule.

The Jordanian census of 1961 found 784 inhabitants here.

Post-1967
Since the Six-Day War in 1967, Jalamah has been under  Israeli occupation.

On 14 September 2022, 2 Palestinians and 1 Israeli soldier were killed in a shootout at an Israeli military checkpoint on the border with the West Bank.

See also
Nasser Abufarha

Footnotes

Bibliography

 (p.  29)

External links
  Welcome To Jalama
Jalama, Welcome to Palestine
Survey of Western Palestine, Map 9:  IAA, Wikimedia commons 

Jenin Governorate
Villages in the West Bank
Municipalities of the State of Palestine